In 2020, voters in the U.S. state of Oregon passed Ballot Measure 107, allowing limits on political campaign contributions. This ballot measure overturned the 1997 Oregon Supreme Court ruling in Vannatta v. Kiesling that the Oregon Constitution’s freedom of speech protections bar the legislature from limiting campaign finance activity.  However, the text of the amendment states that only campaign contribution limit laws and ordinances adopted on or after January 1, 2016 will be considered constitutional, so limits enacted prior to that date (Measure 47 for instance, which was enacted in 2012), remain unenforceable unless re-enacted. As of 2023, this is the most recent statewide ballot measure in Oregon to win over support from all 36 counties, as well as the last one to win majority support in Lake and Sherman counties.

See also
 List of Oregon ballot measures

References

2020 Oregon ballot measures
Campaign finance reform in the United States